The  is a Japanese railway line owned by the Kintetsu Railway. The line connects Fuse Station in the eastern suburbs of Osaka to Kintetsu Nara Station in the historic city of Nara, though operationally, the line begins at Ōsaka Namba Station on the Namba Line. Additionally, some trains run through-services starting at Kobe Sannomiya Station on the Hanshin Railway Main Line in Kobe. Eastern satellite cities such as Higashiosaka and Ikoma are connected by the line. This line is more direct than the JR line between Osaka and Nara.

History

Whereas the JR West Yamatoji Line routes south of the Ikoma mountain range to connect Osaka and Nara, the Kintetsu Nara Line uses a  tunnel through the Ikoma mountain range. As a result, the Kintetsu route is more direct and has allowed municipalities along the line such as Ikoma to flourish as major commuter hubs. To respond to high demand, the railway operates services with up to ten cars long during the peak hours operating as rapid and limited express services. Because of the direct routing, the Nara Line is highly regarded for being the most important commuter rail route in the Kinki region. Higher demand over the years has gradually lead to a reduction of faster midday services as Kintetsu moved to a higher frequency of limited express trains during peak hours.

In 1969 the voltage was increased to 1500 VDC, and in 1970 the Namba Line was opened, and the operational starting station of the Line moved to Kintetsu Namba Station, from Uehonmachi Station of Osaka Line.

Operation
Trains run to and from the Kintetsu Namba Line and the Hanshin Namba Line, and lead to Osaka Namba Station and Amagasaki Station, and Rapid Express trains also to Kobe Sannomiya Station on the Hanshin Main Line.  Between Yamato-Saidaiji and Kintetsu Nara, through trains of the Kyoto Line also run.

Local trains
Amagasaki (Hanshin) or Ōsaka Namba - Higashi-Hanazono or Yamato-Saidaiji (partly Kintetsu Nara)
in the morning and the evening:Amagasaki (Hanshin) or Ōsaka Namba - Hyotan-yama or Higashi-Ikoma
partly: Amagasaki (Hanshin) or Ōsaka Namba - Ishikiri
partly: Yamato-Saidaiji - Kintetsu Nara
only one train: Ikoma → Yamato-Saidaiji (as the last connection from the last limited express train from Osaka for Nara)
Suburban Semi-Express trains
Amagasaki (Hanshin) or Ōsaka Namba - Yamato-Saidaiji or Kintetsu Nara
Semi-Express trains
Amagasaki (Hanshin) or Ōsaka Namba - Yamato-Saidaiji or Kintetsu Nara
Express trains, Limited Express trains
Ōsaka Namba - Kintetsu Nara
Rapid Express trains
Kobe Sannomiya (Hanshin) or Amagasaki (Hanshin) or Ōsaka Namba - Kintetsu Nara

Stations
●: Trains stop.
|: Trains pass.
▲: Trains stop when the large events are held at Kintetsu Hanazono Rugby Stadium.
※: One rapid express train for Nara stops at Ayameike on school days for Kinki University Elementary School and Kinki University Kindergarten.

Local trains (普通, Futsū or 各駅停車, Kakueki-teisha) stop at every station.

References

Kyoto Municipal Subway
Nara Line
Rail transport in Nara Prefecture
Rail transport in Osaka Prefecture
Railway lines opened in 1914
Standard gauge railways in Japan
Railway lines opened in 1970